It Takes a Church is an American dating game show hosted by Natalie Grant and broadcast by Game Show Network. The show travels to multiple churches across the country looking for single members of congregations looking for a partner. The congregation of the church is primarily in charge of looking at potential daters and judging which one would be the best match. The first season, sponsored by Christian Mingle, began airing on June 5, 2014. The series was later renewed for a second season, which began airing March 26, 2015.

The series received mixed reviews; one critic gave the series an "Amen!" while another argued the viewers should "pass" on watching it. Ratings for the first season provided six million total viewers for the eight episodes, while the second season saw a decline in the ratings.

Gameplay

The series travels to various churches and congregations to have a single, unsuspecting member of the church presented with potential suitors. Each episode begins at the setting of a church service, with host Natalie Grant appearing to introduce the show. A single member of the congregation is introduced to his or her surprise, while members of the congregation then nominate other single members of the congregation as suitors. The number of suitors is immediately narrowed down to four; they are the top three as voted by the congregation and a fourth chosen by the pastor or minister.

In the first round, the single member spends time in the community (usually at a charitable event) with two suitors at a time. During this time, a group of matchmakers watches the events as they are recorded on camera. Once all four suitors have interacted with the single member, the matchmakers provide their input before the single member eliminates a suitor of his or her choice. The church's pastor moderates the second round, setting up the suitors on their own dates with the single member before spending time one-on-one with each of the suitors. The pastor then makes recommendations to the single member, who in turn eliminates another suitor. The final round consists of actual one-on-one dates between the single member and each of the suitors. After the dates, the congregation gathers to see who the single member has deemed the "winner," while the matchmaker who originally suggested the winner at the start of the episode earns the church a $10,000 donation in his or her name. Additionally, the suitors who are not selected receive a free, one-year membership to the online dating website Christian Mingle.

Production
GSN first announced the show in their upfront presentation on April 9, 2013. The network then ordered eight episodes on December 17, the first of which premiered on June 5, 2014. During the first season, the series was sponsored by Christian Mingle. On August 21, 2014, the series was renewed for a second season, which premiered March 26, 2015.

Reception
It Takes a Church has received mixed reviews from critics. Tom Conroy of Media Life enjoyed the premiere episode, arguing that it may even attract a secular audience: "Even secular viewers will be curious to see which one Angela picks, and they’ll get a glimpse into a subculture that is largely invisible on TV. Members of that subculture, on the other hand, will watch It Takes a Church and say, 'Amen!'". Contrastly, Neil Genzlinger of The New York Times called the series "utterly frivolous," and called into question the "state of America's spiritual health" after watching an episode. Genzlinger also argued that the show was a not much more than a "desperate" effort to find something the conservative Christian audience will watch. Carrie Grosvenor of About Entertainment added that viewers should "pass" on the series, calling GSN's The American Bible Challenge a better "solid game format."

Ratings
The series garnered over six million total viewers for its first season, posting significant gains in multiple demographics (including women ages 18−49 and 25−54) versus the time period the previous year. Ratings during the second season dropped significantly; the April 23, 2015 airing earned only 207,000 viewers and a 0.03 rating among adults 18−49.

References

External links
 at the Wayback Machine

2010s American game shows
2010s American reality television series
2014 American television series debuts
2015 American television series endings
English-language television shows
Game Show Network original programming
Television series by Authentic Entertainment
American dating and relationship reality television series